Hercules George Robert Robinson, 1st Baron Rosmead,  (19 December 1824 – 28 October 1897), was a British colonial administrator who became the 5th Governor of Hong Kong and subsequently, the 14th Governor of New South Wales, the first Governor of Fiji, and the 8th Governor of New Zealand. From June 1859 until August 1896, he was known as Sir Hercules Robinson.

Early life and Government career
He was of Irish descent on both sides; his father was Admiral Hercules Robinson, his mother was Frances Elizabeth Wood, from Rosmead, County Westmeath, from which he afterwards took his title. From the Royal Military College, Sandhurst, he was commissioned into the 87th Foot as a Second Lieutenant on 27 January 1843, he was promoted Lieutenant by purchase on 6 September 1844, and reached the rank of Captain. However, in 1846, through the influence of Lord Naas, Robinson obtained a post in the Board of Public Works in Ireland and subsequently became chief commissioner of fairs and markets.

His energy in these positions, notably during the famine of 1848, and the clearness and vigour of his reports, secured for him at the age of 29 the office of president of the council of the island of Montserrat on 14 February 1854.

Robinson also pushed for the introduction of a cadet scheme in the colonial administration during the similar serendipitous civil service reforms advocated by William Gladstone, the then chancellor of the exchequer. He proposed a civil service examination held in the UK that selected the successful candidates (the cadet) to learn Chinese and subsequently work in Hong Kong. The approval of the Colonial Office to this proposal resulted in the gradual expansion of the cadet and although the cadet did not fulfil the initial expectation of working as an interpreter, they provided excellent civil service in the administration and established rules in the process, emancipating the administration from ad hoc and disorganised practices.

Service in St Kitts and Hong Kong
Subsequently, Robinson was appointed lieutenant-governor of Saint Kitts on 6 November 1855, serving until 1859. On 17 June 1859, at age of 35 Robinson was appointed as Governor of Hong Kong, the youngest in Hong Kong colonial history, as which he served until March 1865. On 28 June 1859, he was knighted in recognition of his services for introducing coolie labour into the territory.

During his tenure, Robinson secured the control of the Kowloon Peninsula from the Imperial Chinese Government, thus expanding the size of the territory. Up to this point, the Colony of Hong Kong only consisted of Hong Kong Island. Also, Robinson ordered the construction of the Pokfulam Reservoir, which would provide a steady supply of water for Hong Kong people for years to come. Robinson was also credited with establishing Towngas, the territory's premier gas provider (a position it still holds today), for lighting the streets.

During Robertson's administration, HSBC, along with Standard Chartered, were established in Hong Kong. Both were given the responsibility to print banknotes on the behalf of the Government, a responsibility both banks still hold today.

Service in Ceylon, New South Wales and New Zealand
On 6 March 1865, Robinson was appointed Governor of Ceylon. On 30 June 1869, he was appointed Knight Commander of the Order of St Michael and St George (KCMG). From 4 March 1872 to 24 February 1879, he served as the Governor of New South Wales. Before his arrival in the colony, the Australian Town and Country Journal apprised its readers of Robinson's "high reputation for administrative ability" and provided biographical details. He attended the official opening of Sydney's grand new General Post Office on 1 September 1874.

During this governorship, Robinson was involved in the successful efforts to annexe the Fiji Islands to the British Empire, and his services were rewarded on 28 January 1875 by promotion to Knight Grand Cross of the Order of St Michael and St George (GCMG). He temporarily served as Governor of Fiji from 10 October 1874 to June 1875, while concurrently Governor of New South Wales. On 24 February 1879, Robinson was transferred to New Zealand, and on 21 August 1880, in the wake of the Anglo-Zulu War, he succeeded Sir Henry Bartle Frere as High Commissioner for Southern Africa (George Cumine Strahan was also appointed as interim administrator to act until Robinson could arrive from New Zealand).

Service in South Africa
Robinson arrived in South Africa shortly before the disaster of Majuba, and was one of the commissioners for negotiating a peace and determining the future status of Transvaal. The job was known to be personally distasteful to him, for it left him with the task of conciliating, on the one hand, a Dutch party elated with victory, and on the other hand a British party almost ready to despair of the British connection.

In 1883, Robinson was called home to advise the government on the terms of the new convention concluded with the Transvaal Boers, and was appointed a member of the Privy Council. On 27 February 1884 Robinson signed the London Convention for the British government, with Paul Kruger, the new state president of the South African Republic, S.J. du Toit and N.J. Smit signing for the South African Republic.

On his return to South Africa, Robinson he found that a critical situation had arisen in Bechuanaland (today's Botswana), where Boer commandos had seized large tracts of territory and proclaimed the republics of Stellaland and Goshen. The commandos refused to retire within the limits of the Transvaal as defined by the new convention, and Robinson, aware of the necessity of preserving this country – the main road to the north – for the British Empire, determined on vigorous action.

John Mackenzie and later Cecil Rhodes were sent to secure the peaceful submission of the Boers, but without immediate result, partly owing to the attitude of the Cape ministry. Robinson's declaration that the advice of his ministers to patch up a settlement with the filibustering Boers was equivalent to a condonation of crime, led to the expedition of Major General Sir Charles Warren and the annexation of Bechuanaland early in 1885. He repeatedly argued for the Bechuanaland Protectorate to be extended north, beyond 22°. The British government resisted the idea until 1890, when land north of 22° was incorporated.

The difficulties of Robinson's position were illustrated by the dispute which arose between him and Warren, who declared that the high commissioner's duties to the home government were at times in conflict with the action which, as governor of Cape Colony, he was bound to take on the advice of his ministers in the interests of the colony. Sir Hercules Robinson succeeded in winning the confidence of President Kruger by his fair-mindedness, while he seconded Rhodes' efforts to unite the British and Dutch parties in Cape Colony. His mind, however, was that of the administrator as distinguished from the statesman, and he was content to settle difficulties as they arose.

In 1886, Robinson investigated the charges brought against Sir John Pope Hennessy, Governor of Mauritius, and decreed his suspension pending the decision of the home authorities, who eventually reinstated Hennessy. In 1887 Robinson was induced by Rhodes to give his consent to the conclusion of a treaty with Lobengula which secured British rights in Matabele and Mashona lands.

In May 1889, Robinson retired. In his farewell speech, he declared that there was no permanent place in South Africa for direct Imperial rule. This was interpreted to mean that South Africa must ultimately become independent – an idea repugnant to him. He explained in a letter to The Times in 1895 that he had referred to the "direct rule of Downing Street over the crown colonies, as contrasted with responsible colonial government."

Robinson was created a baronet on 6 February 1891. Early in 1895, when he had entered his 71st year in below average health, he yielded to the entreaties of Lord Rosebery's cabinet, and went out again to South Africa, in succession to Sir Henry Loch.

Second term as Governor of Cape Colony
His second term of office was not fortunate. The Jameson Raid produced a permanent estrangement between him and Cecil Rhodes, and he was out of sympathy with the new colonial secretary, Joseph Chamberlain, who had criticised his appointment, and now desired Robinson to take this opportunity of settling the whole question of the position of the Uitlanders in the Transvaal.

Robinson answered that the moment was inopportune and that he must be left to choose his own time. Alarmed at the imminent danger of war, he confined his efforts to inducing the Johannesburgers to lay down their arms on condition that the raiders' lives were spared, not knowing that these terms had already been granted to Jameson. He came home to confer with the government, and on 10 August 1896 was raised to the peerage as Baron Rosmead, of Rosmead in the County of Westmeath and of Tafelberg in South Africa. The new Lord Rosmead returned to South Africa later in the year, but was compelled by ill-health, in April 1897, to quit his post.

Personal life
Robinson married The Honourable Nea Arthur Ada Rose D'Amour Annesley, fifth daughter of The 10th Viscount Valentia, in 1846. Lady Robinson was described as  "a majestic-looking woman", "fond of gaiety and society".

Their daughter, Nora, (born in St Kitts in 1858) married Alexander Finlay in St James' Church, Sydney on 7 August 1878. This vice-regal wedding attracted great interest from the populace and press. A crowd of up to 10,000 onlookers was reported and the guest list included many of the most important people in the colony.

Robinson died in London on 28 October 1897, and is buried in Brompton Cemetery, London. His son, Hercules Arthur Temple Robinson, succeeded to the title of Baron Rosmead.

Legacy
In Hong Kong, Robinson Road, Rosmead Road, and Robinson Island were all named after him. There was a Robinson Road in the Kowloon Peninsula that was named after him. However, the name was changed to Nathan Road on 19 March 1909. In Sri Lanka, Rosmead Place in Colombo 7 was named after him.

In South Africa, there are two Rosmead Avenues in Cape Town, one in Claremont–Kenilworth and the other in Oranjezicht, a suburb of Cape Town proper. South Africa also includes two small towns named Rosmead, one near Kimberley in the Northern Cape and one near Middelburg in the Eastern Cape.

In Australia, a building in Crown Street, Sydney, includes a couple of terraced houses named for Hercules Robinson. A monumental bust of Sir Hercules sits atop the facade. On Sydney's General Post Office at 1 Martin Place, on the Pitt Street side arches of the building, there are carvings of four of New South Wales governors including Sir Hercules.

Honours and arms
 Knight Bachelor, 1859
 Knight Commander of the Order of St Michael and St George (KCMG), 1869
 Knight Grand Cross of the Order of St Michael and St George (GCMG), 1875
 Baronet of Ennismore Gardens in the Parish of St Margaret, Westminster, in the County of London, 1891
 Baron Rosmead, of Rosmead in the County of Westmeath and of Tafelberg in South Africa, 1896

See also

References

Sources

Further reading

 

1824 births
1897 deaths
1874 in Fiji
19th-century British politicians
87th (Royal Irish Fusiliers) Regiment of Foot officers
British Anglicans
Burials at Brompton Cemetery
Colony of New South Wales people
Governors of British Ceylon
Governors of British Saint Christopher
Governors of Fiji
Governors of Hong Kong
Governors of New South Wales
Governors of the Cape Colony
Governors-General of New Zealand
Graduates of the Royal Military College, Sandhurst
High Commissioners for the Western Pacific
Knights Grand Cross of the Order of St Michael and St George
Members of the Privy Council of the United Kingdom
People from County Westmeath
Irish knights
Rosmead, Hercules Robinson, 1st Baron
Peers of the United Kingdom created by Queen Victoria